School boards were public bodies in England and Wales between 1870 and 1902, which established and administered elementary schools.

School boards were created in boroughs and parishes under the Elementary Education Act 1870 following campaigning by George Dixon, Joseph Chamberlain and the National Education League for elementary education free from Anglican doctrine.
Education was still not free of fees. Members were directly elected, not appointed by borough councils or parishes. Each board could:
raise funds from a rate
build and run non-denominational schools where existing voluntary provision was inadequate
subsidise church schools where appropriate 
pay the fees of the poorest children
if they deemed it necessary, create a by-law making attendance compulsory between ages 5–13 - until the Elementary Education Act 1880 when it became compulsory for all. 
were not to impose any religious education, other than simple Bible reading

Unusually for the time, women were eligible to win election to school boards.  When the first elections were held, in 1870, seven women were elected across the country: Anne Ashworth and Caroline Shum in Bath, Catherine Ricketts in Brighton, Lydia Becker in Manchester, Marian Huth in Huddersfield, Eleanor Smith in Oxford, and Jennetta Temple in Exeter.

School boards were abolished by the Education Act 1902, which replaced them with local education authorities.

See also
Joseph Chamberlain
History of education in England
National Education League
Birmingham board schools
London School Board
List of former board schools in Brighton and Hove
Board of education - US

References

Sources
Educational Documents, England and Wales 1816 to the present day, J Stuart MacLure, 1965, 1979,  370.942
Education in Britain 1750–1914, W B Stephens, 1998, 

England and Wales
History of education in England
History of education in Wales
Educational organisations based in England
Educational organisations based in Wales